Alexander Hardie (15 April 1900 – 1975) was a Scottish professional footballer who made 278 appearances in the English Football League playing for Charlton Athletic, Plymouth Argyle and Exeter City. He played as a left half.

Hardie was born in Kilsyth (then in Stirlingshire) and played for Scottish Football League clubs Third Lanark (Division One) and Solway Star (Division Three) before coming to England in 1925 to play for Charlton Athletic. In 1926 he joined Plymouth Argyle. He made 241 appearances for the club in all competitions over seven seasons, the last of which came in May 1933, after which he played in the League for one more season for Exeter City, and then played local football for Truro City.

References

1900 births
Date of birth missing
1975 deaths
Date of death missing
People from Kilsyth
Scottish footballers
Association football wing halves
Third Lanark A.C. players
Charlton Athletic F.C. players
Plymouth Argyle F.C. players
Exeter City F.C. players
Truro City F.C. players
English Football League players
Solway Star F.C. players
Scottish Football League players
Footballers from North Lanarkshire